Devon Larratt (born 24 April 1975) is a Canadian professional armwrestler, content creator, and a former member of the Canadian Armed Forces. Devon Larratt is widely considered to be one of the best arm wrestlers of all time, and is arguably the #1 ranked arm-wrestler in North America. His contribution in popularising the sport to a wider audience through his countless collaborations with others, his YouTube Channel and simply his domination of the sport was immense.

Early life 
Born in Victoria, British Columbia, Canada to a German mother, Devon could speak German up until he was 2 years old. His interest in arm wrestling began as an early teenager. Larratt's first opponent was his grandmother, a farmworker, who claimed to be "the best arm-wrestling woman in Alberta." From there, Larratt progressed to competing on the oil fields of western Canada. Larratt joined the Canadian Special Operations Forces Command at the age of 21, where he served with Joint Task Force 2 for sixteen years. He achieved the rank of master corporal, and was deployed seven times to Afghanistan, where he was wounded in action. Despite his deployments, Larratt managed to train and compete during his military service, and credits the experience gained at different military bases as a large part of his success. Larratt also competed in Judo during his youth.

Early career  

In 1999, Larratt entered his first international competition, competing at a worlds event in Japan, where he defeated Krister Jonsson and lost to John Brzenk. Larratt placed third in the left handed 100Kg competition.

In 2003, at the Ontario Championships, Larratt defeated Robert Graham and Mike Gould.

In 2004, Devon Larratt once again dominated the Ontario Championships, but lost a super match in Chehalis, Washington against John Brzenk.

In 2006, after returning from a six month deployment, Larratt defeated Ron Bath 3-1, at a Mike Classic event in Ontario, Canada. At the time Ron Bath was considered the #3 ranked heavy weight in North America, behind only John Brzenk and Travis Bagent. Devon Larratt has stated that this was his favorite match, "for a number of reasons", but mostly because of the difficulties and stressors of combat, and the uncertainty of returning to a "normal life". Larratt was shot, and took shrapnel to the hand while deployed to Afghanistan.

Career timeline

ArmWars

In 2007, Devon Larratt joined ArmWars, again defeating Ron Bath, this time with a score of 6-5 at the Trafford center in Manchester, England.

In 2008, Larratt was the first man in twenty five years to beat John Brzenk in a super-match. After defeating the arm-wrestling legend, 6-0, Larratt became an internationally recognized armwrestler, and was considered the new #1 ranked right handed arm-wrestler in the world. In the same year, Larratt also beat Marcio Barboza and Travis Bagent, defeating them both by the score of 5-1.

In 2010, Devon Larratt beat Travis Bagent 5-2, Tim Bresnan 5-1, and Don Underwood 4-3, to become the #1 ranked arm-wrestler in the world (both left and right).

In 2011, Devon Larratt defeated former Arnold Classic champion and number one contender, Don Underwood, to retain the right-hand title. He also defeated "Monster" Michael Todd and Christophe Ladu. Devon Larratt lost his left-hand title to Travis Bagent at UAL Backyard Brawl, but beat Bagent 3-0 for the right hand title at the same event.

UAL/MLA/ArmBet

In 2012, after ArmWars went into abeyance, Devon Larratt participated in UAL/MLA and ArmBet tournaments, where he defeated Tim Bresnan for the MLA right hand super heavy weight title. In the same year, Larratt defeated Andriy Pushkar at ArmBet 42, winning 5-1 to win the left hand title.

In 2013, Larratt beat Oleg Zhokh, Wilton Brock, and Eric Woelfel at UAL 4 to retain his left hand heavyweight title. He then underwent surgery on both elbows. As a result of the injury, Larratt lost his number one pound-for-pound ranking. He underwent a similar procedure on his left elbow in 2016, but was able to recover much faster, returning to win the WAL championship in the same year.

WAL & Super Matches 

After recovering from elbow surgery, Devon Larratt joined the World Armwrestling League in 2014, where he returned to win the left-handed title, defeating Marcio Barboza, 3-0. At the same event, Larratt lost the right-handed title to Marcio Barboza 0-3.

In 2015, Larratt lost the WAL left-hand heavyweight title after Marcio Barboza withdrew (injury). In the right handed semi-finals, Larratt lost to American arm-wrestling legend John Brzenk. While Larratt won the first match in the straps, Brzenk displayed superior hand control and dominated the next two matches outside of the straps to win 2-1.

In 2016, Larratt returned to peak form, successfully defending his titles against top contenders Marcio Barboza, Ron Bath and Matt Mask.

In 2017, Larratt once again retained the WAL right-hand and left-hand heavyweight titles by defeating perennial rival Matt Mask. Larratt also defended his right-hand legacy hammer against a challenge from "Big Frank" Budelewski at Buffalo Fitness Expo, and left hand hammer against Zhao Zi Rui of China.

On May 17, 2018, at WAL 402, Larratt defeated American super heavyweight "Big Daddy" Jerry Cadorette, 3-2, in a right handed supermatch.  At WAL 405, Larratt defeated Matt Mask 3-1. At WAL 406, Larratt lost the right-hand championship to Michael Todd. Later that year, during ArmFight 50, Larratt lost a left handed super match against  Russian wrestling legend Denis Cyplenkov, in which Cyplenkov won 6-0.  After the match, Larratt said Cyplenkov was most likely "25 to 30% stronger". Larratt subsequently rededicated himself to strength training. After these matches, Larratt sent the right handed legacy hammer to Michael Todd and the left handed legacy hammer to Denis Cyplenkov.

On May 23rd, 2019, at  WAL 501, Devon Larratt beat Todd Hutchings 3-0. Hutchings, who typically competes in lower weight classes, performed admirably. In July 2019, at WAL 504, Larratt beat Dave Chaffee 3-1, displaying an impressive king's move and much improved strength. Later that year, at WAL 506, Larratt beat Brazilian champion Wagner Bortolato left-handed 3-1. Devon Larratt also beat the Australian champion Ryan Scott 3-0 on March 26, 2019.

In March 2021, at BAL 204, Larratt defeated Janek Kwias in a supermatch.

King of the Table 

On May 28, 2021, less than five months after recovering from deep vein thrombosis, Devon Larratt agreed to meet Michael Todd at King Of The Table (KOTT) in Dubai for the right-hand heavyweight title. In one of the most hyped matches of all time, Larratt avenged his 2018 loss in dramatic fashion by defeating number one ranked Michael Todd 5-0. Larratt surprised the arm-wrestling community by weighing in heavy at 293 pounds. After the match, Michael Todd stated that the 2021 version of Devon Larratt was the "strongest arm-wrestler he ever faced". Ryan "Blue" Bowen, currently ranked #2 in Australia, speculated that the 2021 version of Larratt may be the "strongest arm-wrestler the world has ever seen", noting that no arm-wrestler has ever defeated Michael Todd "so significantly". 

On December 11th, 2021, at King of the Table II, Devon Larratt beat John Brzenk 4-0 for the right-hand heavy weight title. Larratt was impressive throughout the match, controlling the hand and wrist of John Brzenk in three of the four rounds; when Brzenk did manage to take the hand and wrist in round 1, Larratt was able to stop the drive and make the necessary tactical adjustments. Larratt weighed in at 129.5 kilos, or 285.5 pounds.

Legacy Hammer 

The Legacy Hammer, which was presented to Devon Larratt after he defeated Michael Todd at KOTT 1, has since been passed to Levan Saginashvili, who defeated him at KOTT 4.. The hammer is a symbolic representation of the world's best armwrestler, and the wielder of the legacy hammer must ensure that the hammer belongs to the person most worthy. Current hammer holders as of June 25th, 2022 are Levan Saginashvili (right hand) and Denis Cyplenkov (left hand). Denis Cyplenkov is still recovering from injuries, and is unsure when he will compete again.

Exhibition Boxing 
On August 16, 2021, Devon Larratt accepted a boxing match with the World's Strongest Man Champion Hafþór Júlíus Björnsson. Larratt, who had no previous boxing experience, trained for the match at Tristar Gym, owned by Firas Zahabi. The gym is notable for training a number of top mixed martial artists, including UFC Hall of Famer Georges St-Pierre. When asked why he accepted the match on short notice, Devon stated that he "knows a lot about the sport of arm-wrestling", and that "abandoning his area of expertise" to enter a "fighter dorm", with "professional fighters", is an  "opportunity to grow as a human being". 

The match took place in Dubai, on September 18, 2021, where Larratt lost to Hafþór Júlíus Björnsson by TKO. Larratt landed an early right hook on Björnsson, but Björnsson dominated the rest of the fight with superior foot work and a hard jab. With twenty five seconds remaining in the first round, Björnsson stunned Larratt with a left hook. While some criticized the referee for jumping in prematurely, Devon said it was "probably a good thing the referee stopped the fight".

Past events 
On December 18th, 2021, King of the Table announced that Levan Saginashvili will face Devon Larratt at King of the Table 4 (KOTT 4). The match took place in Dubai, in June 25th 2022. Currently, Levan Saginashvili is considered the #1 armwrestler in the world, both left and right handed, and therefore is considered the heavy favorite. It was said that to win the match, Devon would need to stop Levan's explosive drive, regrip, and drain the power from his opponents hands. Larratt would go on to lose this match 6-0.

Notable matches

Armwrestling style
Devon Larratt is known as both an extremely versatile and enduring armwrestler. Larratt has one of the sports highest table IQ's, and can execute any move whether it be a hook, toproll, press, king's move, or any variation thereof. Additionally, he is unique for his unusually high levels of endurance, a trait that is most advantageous during supermatches. Oftentimes, he only needs to stop the initial surge of his opponent in order to hold them in a disadvantageous position, tire them as the match progresses, and eventually pin them. While Larratt is relatively less muscular than other super heavyweights, he frequently overcomes this power differential with superior technical skill, arm leverage, and hand control, stopping his opponent and draining them of their strength over time rather than explosively overpowering them.

Personal life 
Since 2003, Devon Larratt has been married to Jodi Larratt, an actress and former armwrestler; together, they have three children. Larratt generally eats pancakes while training for super-matches, and these humorous pancake videos have subsequently inspired a comical and entertaining storyline within the arm wrestling community, whereby other armwrestlers discuss and adopt Larratt's "pancake diet". To carry on with this jest, Devon's fans will often mail him maple syrup and pancake mix. Devon is also the owner of Armbet, a mobile matchmaking application for arm wrestlers. Larratt currently resides in Ottawa, Canada with his family.

References

External links
 Devon Larrat's YouTube Channel

1975 births
Male arm wrestlers
Canadian arm wrestlers
Canadian Army personnel
Living people
Sportspeople from Victoria, British Columbia